Jantine van der Vlist (born 1985) is a Dutch beach volleyball player. She has previously played indoor volleyball.

Beach Volleyball
As of 2015, she plays with Sophie van Gestel. At the 2016 Summer Olympics in Rio de Janeiro, the pair played in Pool-E and were eliminated with a set win/loss of 1W/6L.

References

External links 
 
 

1958 births
Living people
Dutch women's beach volleyball players
Beach volleyball players at the 2016 Summer Olympics
Olympic beach volleyball players of the Netherlands
People from Wageningen
Sportspeople from Gelderland
Beach volleyball players at the 2015 European Games
European Games competitors for the Netherlands
21st-century Dutch women